Rackety Rax is a 1932 American pre-Code comedy action film directed by Alfred L. Werker and starring Victor McLaglen, Greta Nissen and Nell O'Day.

Plot
Always looking for an angle, "Knucks" McGloin purchases the mortgage on Canarsie College and then turns its football team's fortunes around by hiring thugs and hooligans as players and nightclub dancers as cheerleaders.

For the biggest game of the season, almost everything goes wrong. Canarsie's quarterback double-crosses his teammates and coach Brick Gilligan (a former Sing Sing inmate) by revealing the team's plays to the opponents. Guns are drawn on both sides, a bomb is tossed into the middle of a huddle and explosions destroy the cars belonging to both of the teams' owners as soon as the game ends.

Cast
 Victor McLaglen as 'Knucks' McGloin  
 Greta Nissen as Voine 
 Nell O'Day as Doris  
 Alan Dinehart as Counsellor Sultsfeldt 
 Stanley Fields as Gilatti 
 Marjorie Beebe as Mrs. McGloin 
 Vince Barnett as 'Dutch'  
 Ward Bond as 'Brick' Gilligan  
 Allen Jenkins as Mike Dumphy  
 Esther Howard as 'Sister' Carrie  
 Ivan Linow as Tossilitis  
 Eric Mayne as Dr. Vanderveer  
 John Keyes as McGloin's Bodyguard  
 Joe Brown as McGloin's Bodyguard  
 Arthur Pierson as 'Speed' Bennett

References

Bibliography
 Aubrey Solomon. The Fox Film Corporation, 1915-1935: A History and Filmography. McFarland, 2011.

External links
 
 

1932 films
American action comedy films
Films directed by Alfred L. Werker
Fox Film films
American black-and-white films
1930s action comedy films
Films scored by Arthur Lange
1932 comedy films
1930s English-language films
1930s American films